

History 
Ilol was a Fourth class Princely state and taluka, comprising four more villages, covering nineteen square miles in Mahi Kantha, ruled by Hindu Makwana Kolis Chieftain of Jhala dynasty and adopted the Title of Thakor.

It had a combined population of 3,806 in 1901, yielding a state revenue of 20,982 Rupees (three quarters from land), paying tributes of 1,863 Rupees to the Maharaja  Gaikwad of Baroda State, 428 Rupees to Idar State and 17 Rupees to Ahmadnagar State.

On 10 July 1943, Ilol ceased to exist, being among the princely states merging under the 'Attachment Scheme' into the Baroda State, following its fate into independent India's Bombay State and after its split into Gujarat.

External links and sources 
 Imperial Gazetteer on DSAL - Mahi Kantha

References

Princely states of Gujarat
Koli princely states